A Safety Match is a 1911 novel by the British writer Ian Hay. In 1921 it was adapted by Hay into a play of the same title.

References

Bibliography
 George Watson & Ian R. Willison. The New Cambridge Bibliography of English Literature, Volume 4. CUP, 1972.

1911 British novels
Novels by Ian Hay